Beaver Lake 17 is a small Mi'kmaq reserve on the Eastern Shore of Nova Scotia, Canada, in the Halifax Regional Municipality. The community is located adjacent to Lower Beaver Lake and is located within the community of Beaver Dam.

References

Indian reserves in Nova Scotia
Communities in Halifax County, Nova Scotia
Mi'kmaq in Canada